Eugene Leroy Mercer (October 30, 1888 – July 3, 1957) was a respected surgeon but was best known for his college football career, while attending the University of Pennsylvania. In 1910, he led Penn to the eastern championship, and then served as the Quakers' captain for the next two seasons. During his time at Penn, Mercer helped the Quakers to a 23–10 football record and received All-American honors in 1910, 1911 and 1912.

In 1908, Mercer cleared  in the pole vault, setting a record which he then broke in 1909. He is credited with becoming the only high school athlete to clear that height with a now-outdated spruce pole. Mercer was named to the United States Olympic team for the 1912 Olympic Games, and placed fifth in the long jump and sixth in the decathlon.  He also competed in baseball, which was a demonstration sport at those Games. Mercer then captained Penn's 1913 champion track team and received All-American honors for his long jump accomplishments, and he won the IC4A long jump titles in 1912 and 1913.

He received his Doctorate in Medicine in 1913 and launched a distinguished career as a physician and educator. He later worked at Swarthmore College as the school's athletic director and as a physical education professor. He also coached the school's lacrosse team in 1918 and 1919.

Mercer returned to Penn in 1930 to serve as the Director and Dean of the school's Physical Education Department. In 1955, he was elected to the College Football Hall of Fame.

Head coaching record

References

External links

 
 

1888 births
1957 deaths
American male decathletes
American male long jumpers
American football fullbacks
Penn Quakers athletic directors
Penn Quakers football players
Swarthmore Garnet Tide athletic directors
Swarthmore Garnet Tide football coaches
Swarthmore Garnet Tide men's lacrosse coaches
Olympic baseball players of the United States
Olympic decathletes
Olympic track and field athletes of the United States
Athletes (track and field) at the 1912 Summer Olympics
Baseball players at the 1912 Summer Olympics
College Football Hall of Fame inductees
People from Kennett Square, Pennsylvania
Coaches of American football from Pennsylvania
Players of American football from Pennsylvania
Baseball players from Pennsylvania